Batrachedra paritor is a moth in the family Batrachedridae. It is found in Jamaica.

This species was described by Ronald W. Hodges in 1966.

References

Natural History Museum Lepidoptera generic names catalog

Batrachedridae
Moths described in 1966